Ready to Fly is the seventh studio album by contemporary Christian music group FFH. It was released on April 15, 2003. The album peaked at #89 on the Billboard 200 and #5 on Top Christian Albums.

Track listing
"You Found Me" (Jeromy Deibler) - 3:35
"Good to be Free" (Jeromy Deibler) - 3:35
"It's a Good Day" (Michael Boggs, Tony Wood) - 3:55
"Ready to Fly" (Jeromy Deibler) - 4:04
"I'll Join the Rocks" (Jeromy Deibler) - 4:28
"Follow Love" (Jeromy Deibler, Scott Krippayne) - 4:36
"Never Gonna be Alone" (Jeromy Deibler) - 3:02
"Ready for a World" (Michael Boggs, Jeromy Deibler) -  4:00
"Waltz for Jennifer" (Jeromy Deibler) - 3:45
"His Love Goes On" (Michael Boggs) - 3:00
"If Not For Christ" (Jeromy Deibler) - 3:28
"Here I Am" (Michael Boggs) - 4:23

Personnel 
FFH
 Michael Boggs – vocals, acoustic guitar 
 Jennifer Deibler – vocals 
 Jeromy Deibler – vocals, acoustic piano 
 Brian Smith – vocals, bass, trumpet 

Additional musicians
 Byron Hagan – keyboards, acoustic piano, Hammond B3 organ
 David Hamilton – keyboards, programming, string arrangements and conductor 
 Jeff Roach – keyboards, acoustic piano, synth bass 
 Jim Hammerly – accordion
 Scott Williamson – keyboards, Wurlitzer electric piano, drums, drum programming, tambourine 
 Lincoln Brewster – electric guitar
 David Cleveland – electric guitar 
 Schuyler Duryee – electric guitar 
 Jerry McPherson – acoustic guitar, electric guitar, bouzouki
 Andrew Ramsey – electric guitar 
 Joey Canaday – bass 
 Mark Hill – bass 
 Matt Pierson – bass 
 Jackie Street – bass 
 Steve Brewster – drums 
 John Hammond – drums 
 Ken Lewis – percussion 
 Dave Williamson – string arrangements and conductor 
 The Nashville String Machine – strings 
 Carl Gorodetzky – string contractor 
 Ric Domenico – music preparation 
 Kyle Hill – music preparation

Production 
 Bob Wohler – executive producer 
 Jeromy Deibler – co-executive producer, liner notes 
 Scott Williamson – producer (1-11), mixing
 David Hamilton – producer (12)
 Randy Poole – recording (1-11), overdub and vocal recording (1-11)
 Lincoln Brewster – overdub and vocal recording (1-11)
 Brent King – string recording (1-11)
 Bill Deaton – recording (12), mixing (12), string recording (12)
 David Streit – vocal recording (12)
 Jerry Yoder – recording 
 Todd Robbins – mixing 
 Shane D. Wilson – mixing 
 Drew Bollman – assistant engineer 
 Phil Cooper – assistant engineer 
 Chris Henning – assistant engineer 
 John Lawry – assistant engineer 
 Michael Modesto – assistant engineer 
 Aaron Shannon – assistant engineer
 Jeff Spence – assistant engineer 
 John Mayfield – mastering 
 Michelle Pearson – A&R production 
 Tim Parker – art direction 
 Jordyn Thomas – art direction 
 Ben Joyner – design 
 Rusty Mitchell – cover design
 Russ Harrington – photography 
 Melissa Schleicher – hair stylist, make-up 
 Mike Atkins Management – management

Studios
 Recorded at Dark Horse Recording Studio, The Carpal Tunnel, The Border, The Sound Kitchen and The Bennett House (Franklin, Tennessee); HMP Studio (Brentwood, Tennessee); Ocean Way (Nashville, Tennessee); Linc's Crib (Roseville, California).
 Mixed at Pentavarit and Quad Studios (Nashville, Tennessee); The Carpal Tunnel and The Border.
 Mastered at Mayfield Mastering (Nashville, Tennessee).

References

External links 
FFH official website
Essential Records

FFH (band) albums
2003 albums
Essential Records (Christian) albums